The Antlers Formation is a stratum which ranges from Arkansas through southern Oklahoma into northeastern Texas. The stratum is cemented with clay and calcium carbonate. In places the sandstone may be conglomeratic or ferruginous (rich in iron oxides).

Based on correlation with the Trinity Group of Texas, the Antlers Formation is estimated to be late Aptian-early Albian. This age range is supported by the presence of two dinosaurs that are also known from the Cloverly Formation, Deinonychus and Tenontosaurus.

Amphibians
Indeterminate frog remains. Possible indeterminate salamander remains.

Fish 
References: Cifelli et al. 1999; Wedel et al. 2000, Kielan-Jarorowska and Cifelli 2001; Nydam and Cifelli 2002.

Cartilaginous fish

Ray-finned fish
Possible indeterminate amid remains. Possible indeterminate lepisosteid remains. Possible indeterminate semionotidae remains.

Mammals
Possible indeterminate deltatheroidan material. Indeterminate multituberculate remains. Indeterminate tribosphenidan remains.

Reptiles

Crurotarsans
Possible indeterminate atoposaurid remains. Possible indeterminate goniopholidid remains. Possible indeterminate pholidosaurid remains.

Lepidosaurs
Possible indeterminate scincid remains.

Ornithischians

Saurischians
Possible indeterminate bird remains are known from the formation.

Turtles

See also 
 List of dinosaur-bearing rock formations

References

Further reading
Cifelli, R. Gardner, J.D., Nydam, R.L., and Brinkman, D.L. 1999. Additions to the vertebrate fauna of the Antlers Formation (Lower Cretaceous), southeastern Oklahoma. Oklahoma Geology Notes 57:124-131.
Nydam, R.L. and R. L. Cifelli. 2002a. Lizards from the Lower Cretaceous (Aptian-Albian)  Antlers and Cloverly formations. Journal of Vertebrate Paleontology. 22:286–298.
Kielan-Jarorowska, Z., and Cifelli, R.L. 2001. Primitive boreosphenidan mammal (?Deltatheroida) from the Early Cretaceous of Oklahoma. Acta Palaeontologica Polonica 46: 377-391.
Wedel, M.J., Cifelli, R.L., and Sanders, R. K. 2000. Sauroposeidon Proteles, A new sauropod from the Early Cretaceous of Oklahoma. Journal of Vertebrate Paleontology 20:109-114.

Lower Cretaceous Series of North America
Cretaceous geology of Oklahoma
Geologic formations of Arkansas
Cretaceous geology of Texas
Aptian Stage
Natural history of Oklahoma
Natural history of Arkansas
Natural history of Texas
Paleontology in Texas
Paleontology in Arkansas
Paleontology in Oklahoma